The Nagant M1895 Revolver is a seven-shot, gas-seal revolver designed and produced by Belgian industrialist Léon Nagant for the Russian Empire.

The Nagant M1895 was chambered for a proprietary cartridge, 7.62×38mmR, and featured an unusual "gas-seal" system, in which the cylinder moved forward when the gun was cocked, to close the gap between the cylinder and the barrel, providing a boost to the muzzle velocity of the bullet and allowing the weapon to be suppressed (an unusual characteristic for a revolver). In fact, a 38mm long shell covers the whole bullet for this very purpose as well. This way, early Nagant users would avoid dealing with gases of black powder.

Its design would inspire the Pieper M1893 carbine and Steyr 1893 revolver.

Russian M1895 
Léon Nagant and his brother Émile were well known in the Russian Tsar's court and military administration because of the part they had played in the design of the Russian service rifle, the Mosin–Nagant Model 1891. The Nagant M1895 was adopted as the standard issue side arm for the Imperial Russian Army and police officers, where it replaced earlier Smith & Wesson models such as the Model 3.

Production began in Liège, Belgium; however Russia purchased the manufacturing rights in 1898, and moved production to the Tula Arsenal in Russia, and was soon producing 20,000 examples per year.

Until 1918 it was produced in two versions: a double-action version for officers, and a cheaper single-action version for the lower ranks. It continued to be used after the Russian Revolution by the Red Army and Soviet security forces. The distinctive shape and name helped it achieve cult status in Russia and in the early 1930s the presentation of a Nagant M1895 revolver with an embossed Red Star was one of the greatest honors that could be bestowed on a Party Member. The common Russian name for the revolver, наган (nagan) became synonymous with the concept of the revolver in general and was applied to such weapons regardless of actual make or model.

As early as 1933 the M1895 had started to be replaced by the Tokarev semi-automatic pistol but was never fully replaced until the Makarov pistol in 1952. It was still produced and used in great numbers during World War II and
remained in use with the Russian Railways, postal service, and some remote police forces for many years. In the Russian Federation, it was only retired from  use with postal security service in 2003, and from bailiffs security service (Федеральная служба судебных приставов) in 2009.

Technical characteristics 
Revolvers typically have a small gap (sometimes called the flash gap) between the cylinder and the barrel to allow the cylinder to revolve. The bullet must "jump" this gap when fired, which can have an adverse effect on accuracy, especially if the barrel and chamber are misaligned. The gap also is a path for the escape of high pressure hot gases. Expensive revolvers such as Korth and Manurhin are hand-fitted, keeping the gap to a minimum. Mass-produced revolvers may have a gap as large as 0.25mm.

The M1895 by contrast, has a mechanism which, as the hammer is cocked, first turns the cylinder and then moves it forward, closing the gap between the cylinder and the barrel. The cartridge, also unique, plays an important part in sealing the gun to prevent the escape of propellant gases. The bullet is deeply seated, entirely within the cartridge case, and the case is slightly reduced in diameter at its mouth. The barrel features a short conical section at its rear; this accepts the mouth of the cartridge, completing the gas seal. By sealing the gap, the velocity of the bullet is increased by 15 to 45 m/s (50 to 150 ft/s.) This feature also eliminates the possibility of injury from gases escaping through the gap, which can injure a finger if the user holds the gun with a finger positioned beside the gap.

The disadvantage of this design is that Nagant revolvers were laborious and time-consuming to reload, with the need to manually eject each of the used cartridges, and reload one cartridge at a time through a loading gate. At the time the revolver was designed, this system was obsolete. In British service the Webley Revolver uses a top-break cylinder and star extractor to simultaneously eject all spent cartridges and in American service the Smith & Wesson Model 10 uses a swing-out cylinder and star extractor to simultaneously eject all spent cartridges; therefore replacing older single-action revolvers with a side-loading gate and ejector rod to remove spent cartridges individually in succession. However, the Nagant design did have the advantage of requiring less machining than more modern designs.

The Nagant M1895 was made in both single-action and double-action models before and during World War I; they are known colloquially as the “Private's model” and the “Officer’s model”, respectively. Production of the single-action model seems to have stopped after 1918, with some exceptions, including examples made for target competition. Most single-action revolvers were later converted to double-action, making original single-action revolvers rather rare.

Whether fired in single action or double action, the Nagant M1895 has a markedly heavy trigger pull (about ~12 lbs for single and ~20 lbs for double). Enthusiasts have been able to adjust the pull by adjusting the V shaped spring, either by grinding it or shimming it.

History and usage 
The M1895 revolver was used extensively by the Russian Imperial Army and later by the Soviet Union after the Russian Revolution. In Russian service, it was known for its extreme sturdiness and ability to withstand abuse. As one former Imperial Russian officer stated, "if anything went wrong with the M1895, you could fix it with a hammer" 

It was widely employed by the Bolshevik secret police, the Cheka, as well as its Soviet successor agencies, the OGPU and NKVD. Seven Nagant revolvers were used by communist revolutionaries to execute the Russian imperial family and their servants in July 1918. In the police role, it was frequently seen with a cut-down barrel to aid in concealment by plainclothes agents. Despite the advent of the more modern Soviet TT pistol, the M1895 remained in production and use throughout World War II.
The Nagant's sealed firing system meant that the Nagant revolver, unlike most other revolvers, could make effective use of a sound suppressor, and suppressors were sometimes fitted to it.

Suppressed M1895 Nagant revolvers, modified in clandestine workshops, also turned up in the hands of Viet Cong guerrillas during the Vietnam War as assassination weapons. There is an example of a suppressed Nagant M1895 in the CIA Museum in Langley, Virginia, USA.

The weapon has been considered to be "antique" in Belgium so it became legal to be in possession of the weapon. In 2013 the weapon was again prohibited. Nagant revolvers have been found with the terrorist Amédy Coulibaly in 2015 and with a Dutch arms dealer.

Variants

Military 
 Nagant “Private's model” («солдатский» наган) - a single-action version for non-commissioned officers and soldiers
 Nagant “Officer’s model” («офицерский» наган) - a double-action version for officers
 suppressed Nagant with sound suppressor known as the "BRAMIT device" (BRAtya MITiny - "Mitin Brothers") - produced since 1931 for Soviet reconnaissance and scout troops
 Ng wz. 30 (Nagant wz. 30)

Civilian 
 TOZ-36 (ТОЗ-36) - since 1962
 TOZ-49 (ТОЗ-49)
 KR-22 «Sokol» (КР-22 «Сокол») - .22 LR
 Nagant 1910 - An improved version with a swing-out cylinder. It was never accepted into service and had poor civilian market sales.
Shadow-7 - Carbine variant with a 450mm barrel, produced in 2020 by Russian company Test-Oruzhie, chambered for 5.45×18mm.

Cartridges

Russian 

 7.62mm Nagant is also known as 7.62×38mmR (Rimmed) or "Cartridge, Type R". The projectile is seated below the mouth of the cartridge, with the cartridge crimp sitting just above the bullet. When fired, the crimp expands into the forcing cone, completing the gas seal and ostensibly increasing muzzle velocity by approximately 75 ft/s.

Aftermarket cylinders for .32 can be installed, allowing the Nagant to safely fire .32 H&R Magnum or .32 ACP.  Shooting any ammunition other than the 7.62x38mmR cartridge with the original cylinder can cause bodily injury from bullet shrapnel or escaping gas, and the excessive pressures produced by some .32 ammunition could also cause catastrophic failure of the cylinder or frame.

Proper fitting ammunition can be reloaded from .32-20 Winchester brass by using the Lee Nagant die set or .30" carbine dies and 9mm Luger shell-holders in the reloading press. This allows the reloaders to work up a load that fits their needs and is specific for the Nagant. While this eliminates the bulged/split/stuck cases experienced when using .32 S&W and .32 H&R, the gas seal that made the Nagant famous will still not fully function as the .32-20 is not long enough to protrude past the cylinder like the original Nagant ammunition.

Swedish / Norwegian 

Other Nagant revolver designs were also adopted by police and military services of Sweden (7.5mm M1887), Norway (M1893), Poland (Nagant wz. 30), and Greece ( M1895).

The Swedish and Norwegian Nagants used a different cartridge, the 7.5 mm Nagant. This ammunition is interchangeable with the 7.5mm 1882 Ordnance (aka Swiss 7.5mm revolver).

Users

 : Used as a training weapon
 

:In use after independence 

 
 
 
 : Used by security guards as late as 1996
 
 
 : People's Movement for the Liberation of Azawad
 
 : in 1998 were still used by some law enforcement units; until 2003 were used by postal service security guards; at least up to 2006 were used by security guards

 : Adopted on 13 May 1895
 
 
 
 : Used by railway security guards and industrial security guards as late as to 2017

See also 
List of Russian weaponry
Russian roulette
Modèle 1892 revolver

References

Sources  

 Wilson, Royce: "The Nagant M1895 Revolver". Australian & New Zealand Handgun, Issue 4 (January 2006).
 
 Gerard, Henrotin: The Nagant revolvers. HLebooks.com, Ebook (2001).
 Gerard, Henrotin: Nagant revolver Model 1878 explained. HLebooks.com, Ebook (2014).

External links 

 Exploded Parts Diagram of M1895 Nagant Revolver
 NAGANT info
 Nagant 1895 Pictorial
 
 The Belgian Nagant Revolvers
 Nagant 1895 internal mechanism (modern technical drawing)

7.62×38mmR firearms
.32 ACP firearms
Double-action revolvers
Early revolvers
Military revolvers
Police weapons
Revolvers of the Russian Empire
Revolvers of the Soviet Union
Single-action revolvers
Weapons and ammunition introduced in 1895
World War I Russian infantry weapons
Russo-Japanese war weapons of Russia
World War II infantry weapons of the Soviet Union